Niyada Lausunthorn (born 1 August 1948) is a Thai scholar and expert on historical Thai literature. She served as a professor at Kasetsart University's Faculty of Humanities, and has written numerous volumes based on her research on ancient manuscripts of Thai literary works. She is a Fellow of The Royal Society of Thailand.

References

Thai studies scholars
Niyada Lausunthorn
Niyada Lausunthorn
Niyada Lausunthorn
1948 births
Living people